Mur-e Gham-e Vosta (also Romanized as Mūr-e Gham-e Vosţá; also known as Mūr-e Gham) is a village in Zilayi Rural District, Margown District, Boyer-Ahmad County, Kohgiluyeh and Boyer-Ahmad Province, Iran. At the 2006 census, its population was 111, in 25 families.

References 

Populated places in Boyer-Ahmad County